Kiran Ahtazaz (born 1981) is a Pakistani former cricketer who played as a right-handed batter. She appeared in two One Day Internationals for Pakistan, both at the 1997 Women's Cricket World Cup, making her debut against Australia on 14 December 1997. She played domestic cricket for Rawalpindi.

References

External links
 
 

1981 births
Living people
Cricketers from Islamabad
Pakistani women cricketers
Pakistan women One Day International cricketers
Rawalpindi women cricketers